Pauritsch is an Austrian surname  of South Slavic origin.

Notable people with the surname include:
 Jürgen Pauritsch (1977), Austrian former cyclist
 Rene Pauritsch (1964), Austrian football manager and former player

Surnames of Austrian origin
German-language surnames
Germanized Slavic family names